Manushya Mrugam may refer to:

 Manushyamrugam, a 2011 Indian Malayalam-language mystery film
 Manushya Mrugam (1980 film), an Indian Malayalam film